Oregocerata nigrograpta is a species of moth of the family Tortricidae. It is found in Cotopaxi Province, Ecuador.

The wingspan is 30.5 mm. The ground colour of the forewings is cream, mixed with grey and brownish grey. The strigulation (fine streaks) and dots are brownish grey and the markings are brownish grey. The hindwings are cream with brownish spots in the apex area.

Etymology
The species name refers to the black marks on the forewings and is derived from Latin niger (meaning black) and Greek grapta (meaning inscribed).

References

Moths described in 2008
Euliini